Hajdana Radunović (born 10 January 1978) is a Montenegrin women's basketball player, who plays as a center.

References

1978 births
Living people
Sportspeople from Podgorica
Montenegrin women's basketball players
Centers (basketball)
ŽKK Partizan players
New York Liberty players
Montenegrin expatriate basketball people in Serbia
Montenegrin expatriate basketball people in the United States